A Polonophile is an individual who respects and is fond of Poland's culture as well as Polish history, traditions and customs. The term defining this kind of attitude is Polonophilia. The antonym and opposite of Polonophilia is Polonophobia.

History

Duchy and Kingdom of Poland
The history of the concept dates back to the beginning of the Polish state in 966 AD under Duke Mieszko I. It remained strong among ethnic minorities as in allied neighbouring countries and during Polonization of the Eastern Borderlands, Livonia, Silesia and other acquired territories implied by the Polish Crown or the Polish government, thus also triggering Polonophobia.

One of the first recorded potential Polonophiles were exiled Jews, who settled in Poland throughout the Middle Ages, particularly following the First Crusade (1096-1099). The culture and the intellectual output of the Jewish community in Poland had a profound impact on Judaism as a whole over the next centuries, with both cultures becoming somewhat interconnected and being influenced by each other. Jewish historians claimed that the name of the country is pronounced as "Polania" or "Polin" in Hebrew, which was interpreted as a good omen because Polania can be divided into three separate Hebrew words: po (here), lan (dwells), ya (God) and Polin into two words: po (here) lin ([you should] dwell). Thar suggested that Poland was a good destination for the Jews fleeing from persecution and anti-Semitism in other European countries. Rabbi David HaLevi Segal (Taz) expressed his pro-Polish views by stating in Poland, "most of the time the Gentiles do no harm; on the contrary they do right by Israel" (Divre David; 1689). Ashkenazi Jews willingly adopted some aspects of Polish cuisine, language and national dress, which can be seen in Orthodox Jewish communities around the world.

Polish–Lithuanian Commonwealth

When Polish King Stephen Bathory captured Livonia (Truce of Jam Zapolski), he granted the city of Tartu (Polish: Dorpat), now in Estonia, its own banner with the colours and layout resembling the Polish flag. The flag dates from 1584 and is still in use.

When the Poles invaded the Tsardom of Russia in 1605, a self-identified prince, known as False Dmitry I, assumed the Russian throne. A Polonophile, he assured that King Sigismund III of Poland could control the country's internal and external affairs, secure Russia's conversion to Catholicism and thus make it a puppet state. Dmitry's murder was a possible justification for arranging a full-scale invasion by Sigismund in 1609. The Seven Boyars deposed reigning Tsar Boris Godunov to demonstrate their support for the Polish cause. Godunov was transported as a prisoner to Poland, where he died. In 1610, the Boyars elected Sigismund's underage son Władysław as the new Tsar of Russia, but he was never crowned. This period was known as the Time of Troubles, a major part in Russian history that remains relatively unmentioned in Polish historiography because of its implied Polonization policies.

During the Polish–Lithuanian Commonwealth, the Zaporizhian Cossack state was allied to the Catholic King of Poland, and the Cossacks were often hired as mercenaries. That had a strong impact on the Ukrainian language and led to the establishment of a functioning Ukrainian Greek Catholic Church in 1596 at the Union of Brest. The Ukrainians, however, retained their Orthodox Christian faith and Cyrillic alphabet. During the Russo-Polish War of 1654–1667, the Cossacks were divided into the pro-Polish (Right-bank Ukraine) and pro-Russian (Left-bank Ukraine) factions. Petro Doroshenko, who commanded the army of Right-bank Ukraine, and Pavlo Teteria and Ivan Vyhovsky were open Polonophiles and allied to the Polish king. The Polish influence on Ukraine ended with the partitions of the late 18th century, when the territory of contemporary Ukraine was annexed by the Russian Empire.

Under John III Sobieski, the Christian coalition forces defeated the Ottoman Turks at the Battle of Vienna in 1683, which ironically sparked admiration for Poland and its Winged Hussars in the Ottoman Empire. The Sultan named Sobieski the "Lion of Lehistan [Poland]". That tradition was cultivated when Poland disappeared from map for 123 years. The Ottoman Empire, along with Persia, was the only major country in the world not to recognise the Partitions of Poland. The reception ceremony of a foreign ambassador or a diplomatic mission in Istanbul began with an announcement sacred formula: "the Ambassador of Lehistan [Poland] has not yet arrived".

After Partitions

The Partitions of Poland|Partitions, which arguably occurred because of Poland's previous conquests, gave a rise to a new wave of Polonophilia in Europe and the world. Exiled revolutionaries such as Casimir Pulaski and Tadeusz Kościuszko, who fought for the independence of the United States from Great Britain, contributed to the sentiment that is relatively pro-Polish in North America.

When Belgium declared independence from the Netherlands, Belgian diplomats refused to establish diplomatic relations with the Russian Empire for annexing a large portion of Poland's eastern territories during the Partitions. Diplomatic relations between Moscow and Brussels were established only decades later.

The November Uprising in Congress Poland in 1830 against Russia prompted a wave of Polonophilia in Germany, including financial contributions to exiles, the singing of pro-Polish songs, and pro-Polish literature. During the January uprising in 1863, however, the Polonophile sentiment had mostly vanished.

One of the most prominent and self-declared Polonophiles of the late 19th century was the German philosopher Friedrich Nietzsche, who was certain of his Polish heritage. He often expressed his positive views and admiration towards Poles and their culture. However, modern scholars believe that Nietzsche's claim of Polish ancestry was a pure invention. According to biographer R. J. Hollingdale, Nietzsche's propagation of the Polish ancestry myth may have been part of his "campaign against Germany".

One of the strongest centres of Polonophilia in 19th-century Europe was Ireland. The Young Ireland movement and the Fenians saw similarities in both countries as "Catholic nations and victims of larger imperial powers". In 1863, Irish newspapers expressed wide support for the January uprising, which was then seen as a risky move.

Throughout modern history, France was long Poland's ally, especially after French King Louis XV married Polish Princess Marie Leszczyńska, the daughter of Stanislaus I. Polish customs and fashion became popular in the Versailles such as the Polonaise dress (robe à la polonaise), which was adored by Marie Antoinette. Polish cuisine and also became known in French as à la polonaise. Both Napoleon I and Napoleon III expressed strong pro-Polish sentiment after Poland had ceased to exist as a sovereign country in 1795. In 1807, Napoleon I established the Duchy of Warsaw, a client state of the French Empire that was dissolved in 1815 at the Congress of Vienna. Napoleon III also called for a free Poland and his wife, Eugénie de Montijo, astonished the Austrian ambassador (Austria was one of three partitioning powers) by "unveiling a European map with a realignment of borders to accommodate independent Poland".

When Poland finally regained its independence following World War I, Polonophilia gradually transformed into a demonstration of patriotism and solidarity, especially during the horrors of the Second World War and the Polish struggle against communism.

Silesia 

One of the regions that demonstrated its Polish identity was the ethnic Silesian minority in Upper Silesia, which was subjected to systematic Germanisation and conversion to Protestantism under the German Empire. After the Polish nation state was founded in 1918, Germany's Regency of Oppeln (Upper Silesia) rebelled in solidarity with the Second Polish Republic in what became known as the Silesian uprisings. An eastern sliver of the region became part of the Polish Republic in 1922, and the Polish government had decided to grant the German territory autonomy in 1919 with the Silesian Parliament as a legislative and the Silesian Voivodeship Council as the executive body.

After the Second World War II, the whole of Upper Silesia and German Lower Silesia were assigned to Poland in accordance with the Potsdam Agreement. Expulsions and forced Polonization followed.
 However, some Silesians still identify as Polish or German citizens, cultivate their Catholic traditions and preserve their unique and separate identity.

Contemporary

Armenia

Armenians in Poland have an important and historical presence which dates back to the 14th century, however, the first Armenian settlers arrived in the 12th century, which makes them the oldest minority in Poland with the Jews. A very significant and independent Armenian diaspora existed in Poland but was assimilated over the centuries because of Polonization and the absorption of Polish culture. Between 40,000 and 80,000 people in Poland today claim Armenian nationality or Armenian heritage. Mass waves of Armenian immigration to Poland has occurred since the collapse of the Soviet Union in 1991.

Armenians are highly fond of Polish culture and history. Several Armenian cultural features also exist in the Polish national dress, most notably the Karabela sabre introduced by Armenian merchants under Poland-Lithuania.

Georgia

Many Georgians participated in military campaigns that were led by Poland in the 17th century. Bogdan Gurdziecki, an ethnic Georgian, became the Polish king's ambassador to the Middle East and made frequent diplomatic trips to Persia to represent Polish interests. During the war in South Ossetia in 2008, also known as the Russo-Georgian War, Poland strongly supported Georgia. Polish President Lech Kaczyński flew to Tbilisi to rally against the Russian military intervention and the subsequent military conflict. Several European leaders met with Georgian President Mikheil Saakashvili at Kaczyński's initiative at the rally held on 12 August 2008, which was attended by over 150,000 people. The crowd responded enthusiastically to the Polish president's speech and chanted, "Poland, Poland", "Friendship, Friendship" and "Georgia, Georgia".

The main boulevard in the city of Batumi, Georgia, is named after Lech Kaczyński and his wife, Maria.

Hungary

Hungary and Poland have enjoyed good relations since the inauguration of diplomatic relations between the two countries in the Middle Ages. Hungary and Poland have maintained a very close friendship and brotherhood "rooted in a deep history of shared monarchs, cultures, and common faith". Both countries commemorate a fraternal relationship and Friendship Day.

During the Second World War, Hungary refused to allow Adolf Hitler's troops to pass through the country during the invasion of Poland in September 1939. Although Hungary, which was ruled by Miklós Horthy, was allied with Nazi Germany, it declined to participate in the invasion as a matter of "Hungarian honour".

On 12 March 2007, the Hungarian Parliament declared 23 March as the "Day of Hungarian-Polish Friendship", with 324 votes in favor, none opposed, and no abstentions. Four days later, the Polish Parliament declared 23 March as the "Day of Polish-Hungarian Friendship" by acclamation. The Hungarian Parliament also voted 2016 as the Year of Hungarian-Polish solidarity.

The Hungarian-born Prince Stephen Báthory was elected King of Poland in 1576 and is the primary figure of the close ties between the countries.

Italy

Italy and Poland shared common historical backgrounds and common enemies (Austria), and a good relationship is maintained to this day. After the Revolutions of 1848 in the Italian states against the Austrian Empire, Francesco Nullo, a merchant by trade, travelled to Poland to aid the Poles in their January Uprising against Russia. He was killed at the Battle of Krzykawka in 1863 while he fought for Poland's independence. In Poland, Nullo is a national hero, and numerous streets and schools are named in his honour.

The struggle for a united and sovereign nation was a common goal for both countries and was noticed by Goffredo Mameli, a Polonophile and the author of the lyrics in the Italian national anthem, Il Canto degli Italiani. Mameli featured a prominent statement in the last verse of the anthem, Già l'Aquila d'Austria, le penne ha perdute. Il sangue d'Italia, il sangue Polacco.... ("Already the Eagle of Austria has lost its plumes. The blood of Italy, the Polish blood...").

Pope John Paul II also greatly contributed to a favourable opinion of the Polish people in Italy and in the Vatican during his pontificate.

United States

Tadeusz Kościuszko and Casimir Pulaski, who fought for the independence of the United States and Poland, are seen as the foundation of Polish-American relations. However, the United States began to be involved in Poland's struggle for sovereignty during two uprisings, which took place in the 19th century.

When the November Uprising started in 1830, there were very few Poles in the United States, but American views of Poland were shaped positively by their support for the American Revolution. Several young men offered their military services to fight for Poland, the most well-known of which was Edgar Allan Poe, who wrote a letter to his commanding officer on 10 March 1831 to join the Polish Army if it was created in France. Support for Poland was highest in the South, as Pulaski's death in Savannah, Georgia, was well-remembered and memorialized. The most famous landmark representing American Polonophilia of the time was Fort Pulaski in the State of Georgia.

Włodzimierz Bonawentura Krzyżanowski was another hero who fought at the Battle of Gettysburg and helped to repel the Louisiana Tigers. He was appointed the governor of Alabama, Georgia and served as administrator of Alaska Territory, a high distinction for a foreigner at the time. He had fled Poland after the failed 1848 Greater Poland Uprising.

Strong support for Poland and pro-Polish sentiment were also observed by US President Woodrow Wilson. In 1918, delivered his Fourteen Points as peace settlement to end World War I and stated in Point 13 that "an independent Polish state should be erected... with a free and secure access to the sea...".

US President Donald Trump also expressed his sentiment towards Poland and Polish history in his speech in Warsaw on 6 July 2017. Trump spoke highly of the spirit of the Polish for defending the freedom and the independence of the country several times at the speech, notably the unity of Poles against the oppression of communism. He applauded the Poles' prevailing spiritual determination and recalled the gathering of the Poles in 1979 with the famous chant "We want God". Trump also made remarks on Polish economic success and policies towards migrants.

The large Polish-American community maintains some traditional folk customs and contemporary observances, such as Dyngus Day and Pulaski Day, which became well known in American culture. It also includes the influence of Polish cuisine and the spread of famous specialties from Poland like pierogi, kielbasa, Kabana sausage and bagels.

See also
 Polonophobia
 Polish Americans
 History of Poland
 Polonization

References

Polish culture
Polish nationalism
Admiration of foreign cultures